Pigment Yellow 81 is an organic compound that is classified as a diarylide pigment.  It is used as a yellow colorant.

The compound is synthesized from three components. Treatment of 2,4-dimethylaniline with diketene gives an acetoacetylated aniline. This compound is then coupled to the bisdiazonium salt obtained from 3,3'-dichlorobenzidine.

References

Pigments
Organic pigments
Shades of yellow
Diarylide pigments